Events from the year 1903 in Russia.

Incumbents
 Monarch – Nicholas II

Events
14 January - Opening of Hotel National, Moscow
dates unknown
 Chernoe Znamia
 Estonian Chess Championship
 Kharovsk
 Klavdiievo-Tarasove
 Mensheviks
 Rahumäe cemetery
 Ševčík-Lhotský Quartet
 Zimin Opera
ongoing - Central Committee compositions elected by the 1st–3rd congresses of the Russian Social Democratic Labour Party

Births

Deaths

 22 May – Dmitry Gamov, Russian general and explorer (b. 1834)

References

 
Years of the 20th century in the Russian Empire